Marco Evan Ferreira (born 4 October 1987) is a Portuguese professional volleyball player. He is part of the Portuguese national team.

Personal life
His younger brother, Alexandre is also a professional volleyball player.

Honours

Clubs
 National championships
 2004/2005  Portuguese Cup, with Benfica Lisboa
 2004/2005  Portuguese Championship, with Benfica Lisboa
 2005/2006  Portuguese Cup, with Benfica Lisboa
 2006/2007  Portuguese Cup, with Benfica Lisboa
 2016/2017  Portuguese Cup, with SC Espinho

References

External links

 
 Player profile at LegaVolley.it 
 Player profile at Volleybox.net

1987 births
Living people
People from Seia
Sportspeople from Guarda District
Portuguese men's volleyball players
Portuguese expatriate sportspeople in France
Expatriate volleyball players in France
Portuguese expatriate sportspeople in Italy
Expatriate volleyball players in Italy
Portuguese expatriate sportspeople in South Korea
Expatriate volleyball players in South Korea
Portuguese expatriate sportspeople in Qatar
Expatriate volleyball players in Qatar
Portuguese expatriate sportspeople in the United Arab Emirates
Portuguese expatriate sportspeople in Poland
Expatriate volleyball players in Poland
Gwardia Wrocław players
Opposite hitters